This is an index of grand strategy video games, sorted chronologically. Information regarding date of release, developer, platform, setting, and notability is provided when available. The table can be sorted by clicking on the small boxes next to the column headings.

Legend

List

See also
 Grand strategy wargame

Timelines of video games
Grand strategy
Grand strategy video games